Barbodes dunckeri, the bigspot barb or clown barb, is a species of cyprinid fish endemic to the Malay Peninsula where it inhabits clear streams and acidic swamps.  This species can also be found in the aquarium trade. It was first discovered by Ernst Ahl in 1929.

Etymology 
The specific epithet honors Georg Duncker, a German ichthyologist and curator at the Zoological Museum of Hamburg (Zoologischen Museum Hamburg).

See also
List of freshwater aquarium fish species

References 

dunckeri
Barbs (fish)
Taxa named by Ernst Ahl
Fish described in 1929
Cyprinid fish of Asia